"Fill My Little World" is a song by English rock band the Feeling, originally released in the UK on 7 November 2005 as their debut single but was unable to chart due to chart rules. The following year, it was re-released as a digital single in the UK, entering the UK Singles Chart at number 28 on 21 May 2006 based on download sales alone. The following week, it climbed to number 10 after a physical single became available on 22 May.

Music videos
The video for the song has the band performing in a minibeast, a reptile and an amphibian cage.

Track listings
UK CD and 7-inch single (2005)
 "Fill My Little World" – 4:07
 "All You Need to Do" – 3:53

UK limited-edition 7-inch single (2006)
A. "Fill My Little World"
B. "Not Be Turned"

Digital download EP (2006)
 "Fill My Little World" (edit) – 3:39
 "Not Be Turned" – 3:39
 "One Thing That I Want" – 3:20

Charts

Weekly charts

Year-end charts

Certifications

References

2005 debut singles
2005 songs
2006 singles
The Feeling songs
Island Records singles
Songs written by Ciaran Jeremiah
Songs written by Dan Gillespie Sells
Songs written by Kevin Jeremiah
Songs written by Paul Stewart (musician)
Songs written by Richard Jones (The Feeling)